Jeffrey Paul Escoffier (October 9, 1942 – May 20, 2022) was an American author, activist, and media strategist. He was a research associate at the Brooklyn Institute for Social Research. He has taught at the University of California (Berkeley and Davis), Barnard College, The New School, and Rutgers University, Newark. He lived and worked in Brooklyn, New York.

Escoffier earned his undergraduate degree at St. John's College, Annapolis, before doing his graduate work at Columbia University and the University of Pennsylvania. He was the director of health media and marketing for the New York City Department of Health and Mental Hygiene from 1999 to 2015. Escoffier was an active participant in the LGBT community in Philadelphia, San Francisco, and New York City.

Life and career
Jeffrey Paul Escoffier was born to Iris (Miller) Wendel and George on October 9, 1942, in Baltimore, Maryland and raised in Manhattan and Staten Island. His mother was owner of an antique shop and father worked in United States Army. Escoffier obtained bachelor’s degree from St. John’s College and earned master’s degree in international affairs from  Columbia University. In 1970 he moved to Philadelphia where he pursued his doctoral studies in economic history at the University of Pennsylvania. In 1972 he co-founded and served on the editorial board of The Gay Alternative (1972–1976), a gay and lesbian cultural magazine. In 1977 he moved to San Francisco, where he co-founded the San Francisco Lesbian and Gay History Project. In 1978 he joined the editorial board of Socialist Review, a democratic socialistic journal, and served as its executive editor from 1980 to 1988.

In 1988 Escoffier co-founded OUT/LOOK: A National Lesbian and Gay Quarterly, one of the first joint lesbian and gay cultural ventures. Starting in 1990, OUT/LOOK sponsored, under Escoffier's leadership, a series of conferences called OutWrite that brought together over 1,200 LGBT writers from across the U.S. These conferences brought together several notable writers such as Judy Grahn, Allen Ginsberg, Cherrie Moraga, Gore Vidal, Edward Albee, and Essex Hemphill. In the wake of the OutWrite conferences, he worked as a literary agent for lesbian and gay authors across the Bay Area.

Escoffier served on the board of the Center for Lesbian and Gay Studies (CLAGS) at the City University of New York from 1992 to 1995 and then from 2010 to 2013. He was the director of the CLAGS Project on Families, Values, and Public School Curriculum.

In 1995 he joined the NYC Department of Health and Mental Hygiene as the deputy director of the Office of Gay and Lesbian Health. In 2000 he became the director of Health Media and Marketing and held that position until his retirement in August 2015. There he supervised the department's media and public education campaigns on several topics, including smoking cessation, HIV prevention and testing, anti-obesity, ebola, influenza, and immunization.

Escoffier died in Brooklyn on May 20, 2022, aged 79, from complications of a fall.

Works
John Maynard Keynes (New York: Chelsea House, 1995) 
American Homo: Community and Perversity (Berkeley: University of California Press, 1998) 
Mark Morris' L'Allegro, il Penseroso ed il Moderato (New York: Marlowe, 2001)
Sexual Revolution (New York: Thunder's Mouth, 2003) 
Bigger Than Life: The History of Gay Porn Cinema from Beefcake to Hardcore (Philadelphia: Running Press, 2009)
Intimate States: Gender, Sexuality, and Governance in Modern US History (chapter co-written with Whitney Strub and Jeffrey Patrick Colgan) (Chicago and London: The University of Chicago Press, 2021)
Sex, Society, and the Making of Pornography: The Pornographic Object of Knowledge (New Brunswick: Rutgers University Press, 2021)

References

External links
 Brooklyn Institute for Social Research faculty page
 Academia.edu profile page
 
Jeffrey Escoffier records of "The Gay Alternative" held at John J. Wilcox, Jr. LGBT Archives, William Way LGBT Community Center

1942 births
2022 deaths
20th-century American male writers
20th-century American non-fiction writers
21st-century American male writers
21st-century American non-fiction writers
Accidental deaths from falls
Accidental deaths in New York (state)
American civil servants
Activists from Baltimore
Columbia University alumni
LGBT people from Maryland
American LGBT writers
New York (state) socialists
People in public health
St. John's College (Annapolis/Santa Fe) alumni